The Macedonian language has one of the more elaborate kinship (сродство, роднинство) systems among European languages. Most words are common to other Slavic languages, though some derive from Turkish. Terminology may differ from place to place; the terms used in the Standard are listed below, dialectical or regional forms are marked [Dial.] and colloquial forms [Coll.].

There are four main types of kinship in the family: biological  blood kinship, kinship by law (in-laws), spiritual kinship (such as godparents), and legal kinship through adoption and remarriage. Traditionally, three generations of a family will live together in a home in what anthropologists call a joint family structure (reminiscent of the historical zadruga units), where parents, their son(s), and grandchildren would cohabit in a family home.

Direct descendance and ancestry
Words for relations up to five generations removed—great-great-grandparents and great-great-grandchildren—are in common use. The fourth-generation terms are also used as generics for ancestors and descendants. There is no distinction between the maternal and paternal line.

Ego's generation
Macedonian does not have separate terms for first cousins, second cousins and so forth, but uses втор братучед (lit. "second cousin"), трет братучед (lit. "third cousin"), etc.

Relatives

Step-relatives

In-laws

References

Macedonian language
Kinship
Kinship terminology